Iran–Vietnam relations refer to the bilateral relations between Iran and Vietnam, which were formally established in 1973. Iran has an embassy in Hanoi while Vietnam has an embassy in Tehran.

History

Medieval relations
Persian traders had settled its trades in Vietnam during the 15th century and there had been a number of economic relations at that time.

Alexandre de Rhodes, who designed the modern Latin Vietnamese alphabet, died in Isfahan, Iran. Since his death, his grave has been a pilgrimate for many Vietnamese who regarded him as the founding father of modern Vietnamese alphabet and protector of Vietnamese heritage. His grave was later erected in both French, Vietnamese, English and Persian as a dedication.

Pre-Revolution
Relations of both Iran and Vietnam did not really exist due to the Vietnam War. Iran was a pro-Western country while Vietnam was divided between Communist North and Republic South.

Post-Revolution
Three Iranian presidents have visited Vietnam, Hassan Rouhani in 2016, Mahmoud Ahmadinejad in 2012, and Akbar Hashemi Rafsanjani in 1995.

During Rouhani's visit the two nations pledged to boost future trade to $2 billion.

See also
 Foreign relations of Iran
 Foreign relations of Vietnam

References

External links

 
Vietnam
Bilateral relations of Vietnam